In response to shifts in consumer behavior and conditions brought on by postmodernism, many companies changed their marketing approach to address and create more nimble, immersive experience and customer engagements. It is stated that the traditional means of brand management has grown increasingly hard and complex within the postmodern marketplace.  A brand in its modernist or traditional interpretation by marketing schools of thought and accredited, professional associations is defined as a, “name, term, design, symbol or any other feature that identifies one seller’s good or services as distinct from those of other sellers.  This definition, argued by Muzellec and McDonagh refers to the brand as a single reality or focus on only one-way addressable interaction partners that in many way are not current with customer communications.

As a result, many companies are rapidly changing the way they manage the created names, terms, designs, symbols and other marketing material on behalf of the brand.  The significance here is not only focusing on and tracking the organizational created material, but also identifying, monitoring and tracking the material created or suggested by the enthusiast, loyalist, defectors and the like.

In order to properly engage within the postmodern world of marketing a brand will need to adapt of set of new systems that give great insights.

Newly developed systems are in need for a brand to be more nimble and personal with their customers.  Although this is an ever-evolving time it bears witness that there are new rules to the “new now” or “new new now” of marketing. And although an organization employs any platforms and processes the brand manager should realize that the brand they are managing is still just a participant in the community they wish to create. With that said, the organization should come to grips with the idea that they may not own the very brand they created.

Influential postmodern brands

Coke
Coke is one of the more influential brands within the carbonated beverage industries. Although they have experienced an ongoing soda war with Pepsi dating back to the 1960s, they have emerged recently with an approach, Wendy White implies as agnostic and focused on telling engaging stories no matter where the consumer is. Additionally, this approach allows the user to take part in the brand, identify with the story being told and engage in the way he or she feels fit.

As a result of the approach the brand has seen great success in capturing the number two beverage position in terms of units sold while defending their legacy position as number one.

Starbucks
Although Starbucks has had minor setbacks in navigating the “new now”, postmodern marketing landscape (53% drop in profits in 2009), they are still seen to be a leader in the space. At the current writing of this document, the brand has over 25M likes on Facebook with 279 people talking about their brand online.

Additionally the brand has also ushered in a sea of change by creating one of the most intuitive and innovative mobile apps in the market. In partnership with mFoundry, Starbucks created a mobile payment application that is in current use nationwide and within the first two months of the application being live over 3M customers downloaded and used it.

If these two examples are not enough to illustrate the brands commitment to the postmodern model of consumer engagement the use and execution of the branded social network, “MyStarbucksIdea.com” does. MyStarbucksIdea is a perfect example of giving up control of the brand to consumers. The social network allows consumers and loyalists to suggest ideas based on their personal experience with the company. Based on these suggest and the recommendations for the community Starbucks is able to more efficiently plan strategic roadmaps around consumer interactions. To date the brand has received over 120k ideas ranging from ordering, atmosphere, coffee and drinks to new technology.

See also
Postmodern branding

References

Further reading
"I’m Feeling Lucky": by Douglas Edwards
"Marketing Myopia": by Theodore Levitt

Postmodernism
Brand management